Alfred Willommet (born 9 November 1928) was a Swiss boxer. He competed in the men's featherweight event at the 1952 Summer Olympics.

References

External links
 

1928 births
Possibly living people
Featherweight boxers
Swiss male boxers
Olympic boxers of Switzerland
Boxers at the 1952 Summer Olympics
Place of birth missing (living people)